The Edward H. White II Museum of Aerospace Medicine was a museum of the United States Air Force and was located in Hangar 9 at Brooks Air Force Base, San Antonio, Texas.  Brooks Air Force Base closed in 2011 under Base Realignment and Closure Commission (BRAC) procedures, and the museum closed at the same time.

Brooks Field Hangar 9 is located in the Brooks City-Base mixed-use community being developed on the site of the former air base. The development authority has proposed to preserve the historic area around the property.

History
The Bexar County Historical Survey Committee assumed sponsorship of the restoration of Brooks Field Hangar 9 of the old Army Air Corps Brooks Field. The restoration of the Hangar would be used to house an aviation museum. This museum was intended to display the early history of Brooks Field and to preserve and display an extensive collection of photographs and equipment related to aviation and aerospace medicine. It became the Edward H. White II Museum of Aerospace Medicine.

The museum was named after San Antonio native Ed White, an astronaut and the first American to "walk" in space.

Historic registration
The Brooks Field Hangar 9 was accepted and listed in the National Register of Historic Places in 1970 and became a National Historic Landmark in 1976.  The State of Texas has designated this old Hangar 9 as a Recorded Texas Historic Landmark, and a City of San Antonio Historic Landmark.

See also
United States Air Force School of Aerospace Medicine
United States Air Force Medical Service
Flight Surgeon
Flight medic
Air Force Materiel Command

References

External links
 USAF Brooks City-Base (official site)
  Brooks City-Base / Brooks Development Authority (official site)
 U.S. Air Force School of Aerospace Medicine (USAFSAM)
 Brooks City-Base at GlobalSecurity.org
 Google Map of Brooks City-Base

Military facilities on the National Register of Historic Places in Texas
Infrastructure completed in 1918
Medical museums in the United States
Air force museums in the United States
Aerospace museums in Texas
Museum of Aerospace Medicine
Recorded Texas Historic Landmarks
Defunct museums in Texas
United States Air Force School of Aerospace Medicine
National Register of Historic Places in San Antonio
Military in San Antonio